The Volunteers at Shipka (also known as "Oh, Shipka!") is an ode by the classic Bulgarian writer Ivan Vazov, a part of the cycle Epic of the Forgotten.

The ode is dedicated to the participation of the Bulgarian Volunteer Corps (the opalchentsi) in the Battle of Shipka Pass (in August 1877) during the Russo-Turkish War of 1877-1878) that lead to the liberation of Bulgaria from Ottoman rule. The subtitle of the work is "11 August 1877". This adds historicity and the documentary nature of the subject.

Historical figures and events mentioned in the poem are:

 Battle of Kleidion (1014, mentioned as "old Belasitsa")
 Batak massacre (1876, during the April Uprising)
 Battle of Thermopylae (480 BC)
 Suleiman Pasha
 Xerxes
 Nikolai Stoletov
 Fyodor Radetzky

"The Volunteers at Shipka" is one of the most popular Bulgarian poems. For decades it has been studied in detail in primary and secondary school by Bulgarian children, who learn parts or the whole text by heart.

References and notes 

Bulgarian poems
War poetry
Russo-Turkish War (1877–1878)
Bulgarian National Revival
Battle of Shipka Pass